Selly Park Girls' School (formerly Selly Park Technology College for Girls) is a secondary school located in the Selly Park area of Birmingham, in the West Midlands of England.

It is a non-selective community school for girls administered by Birmingham City Council. The school offers GCSEs and BTECs as programmes of study for pupils. It also has specialist status as a Technology College. The school was founded more than 100 years old.

A former headmistress, Wendy Patricia Davies, received a damehood in 2001 for her work improving the school when it was still the Selly Park Technology College for Girls.

References

External links
 

Secondary schools in Birmingham, West Midlands
Girls' schools in the West Midlands (county)
Community schools in Birmingham, West Midlands